Michael Heckert (born 29 October 1950, in Halle an der Saale) is a contemporary painter who dedicates himself to abstract expressionism. The artist depicts and describes the phenomenon of the female. He was influenced by American painter Willem de Kooning.

Life
Heckert grew up in Ostwestfalen, Germany. He presently maintains residences and studios in Cologne, Germany, and in Port-au-Prince, Haiti.

In early childhood Heckert displayed an unusual artistic talent for painting, and he determined to become a painter. His parents judged his passion as “breadless art” and forced him to complete an apprenticeship as a wholesale and foreign trade merchandiser in order to support financially his parental household (out of 96,- German Marks net wage during the first year as an apprentice he had to deliver at home 80,- German Marks ). After 11 years of little success in this occupation he managed – in spite of only having studied up to the compulsory school level –  to study arts in the SHFBK Braunschweig and graduated with outstanding achievements.

Artistic career
Heckert's first exhibition was in 1982 in Cologne, in the Heinz Holtmann Gallery, and was considered successful. His longing for illimitability in expression led 1984 to a change of style in his paintings: he turned away from the half figurative paintings and sought to materialise his mode of expression in abstract painting. Despite the strong influence of de Kooning, he developed his own form for his artistic contents: The female.

At the beginning of 2007 Heckert moved to Port-au-Prince, where he encountered new impressions and challenges. The local art which predominantly deals with Voodoo and the everyday life of the Haitian people inspires increasingly his oeuvre.

Exhibitions and works (extract)
Individual exhibitions
1981 Galerie Gruppe weisses Pferd
1983 Galerie Heinz Holtmann (Cologne)
1984 Galerie Heinz Holtmann
1985 Galerie Kunsträume (Cologne)
1986 Kunstverein (Wolfenbüttel)
1987 Galerie Sassi (Stockholm)
1987 Galerie Bistborno (Malmö)
1988 Galerie Engelbrekt (Orebrö)
1988 Galerie Hermann Walther (Düsseldorf)
1988 Universitätsmuseum (Marburg)
1989 Wilhelmshöhe (Karlsruhe-Ettlingen)
1991 Galerie Hermann Walther
1993 Galerie Hermann Walther
1994 Kunstverien (Oldenburg)
1994 Galerie Höhne (Cuxhaven)
1997 Bischöfliche Akademie (Aachen)
1998 Villa Jule Thyssen (Mülheim-Ruhr)
1998 Schloß Arenfels (Bad Hönningen)
2000 Galerie Lichthof VHS (Cologne)
2001 Schloß Arenfels
2002 Behringwerke (Marburg)
2003 LOG-Galerie (Marburg)

Group exhibitions
1980 Braunschweiger Künstlerpreis Schloss (Wolfsburg)
1981 Galerie weisses Pferd (Hanover)
1982 Vier junge Deutsche Maler Galerie Holtmann (Cologne)
1983 Künstler in Niedersachsen Kunstverein (Hanover)
1984 Profile-Impulse Herzog-Anton-Ulrich Museum (Brunswick)
1987 Helms-Museum (Hamburg) (M. René Havekost u. Th. Zielinski)
1988 Kunsthaus (Hamburg)
1988 Köln-Kunst 2 Josef-Haubrich-Kunsthalle (Cologne)
1982- 1991 Große Düsseldorfer Kunstausstellung Ehrenhof (Düsseldorf)
1991 Köln-Kunst 3 Josef-Haubrich Kunsthalle (Cologne)
1999 Deutsche Post AG Hauptverwaltung (Bonn)

Prizes and awards
1980 Braunschweig price of artists HBK
1982 Lower-Saxony award of promotion, Hanover
1986 Award of promotion of the big art exhibition in NRW Düsseldorf
1987 Artist as a guest in Hamburg-Harburg
1997 'Augenblicke' OPTICA 97, 3rd place

Works in collections
Museum Ludwig (Cologne)
Deutsche Bank (Frankfurt/Main)
Government of the State of Hanover
University Museum (Marburg)
Sparkasse (Cuxhaven)
IKB-Bank (Düsseldorf)
Lingenbrink (Hamburg)
Several private collections

External links 
Artist's website
The academy of arts: HBK Braunschweig
Museum Ludwig, Cologne
Deutsche Bank Art
The museum of the university of Marburg

1950 births
Living people
20th-century German painters
20th-century German male artists
German male painters
21st-century German painters
21st-century German male artists